African art describes the modern and historical paintings, sculptures, installations, and other visual culture from native or indigenous Africans and the African continent. The definition may also include the art of the African diasporas, such as: African-American, Caribbean or art in South American societies inspired by African traditions. Despite this diversity, there are unifying artistic themes present when considering the totality of the visual culture from the continent of Africa.

Pottery, metalwork, sculpture, architecture, textile art and fiber art are important visual art forms across Africa and may be included in the study of African art. The term "African art" does not usually include the art of the North African areas along the Mediterranean coast, as such areas had long been part of different traditions. For more than a millennium, the art of such areas had formed part of Berber or Islamic art, although with many particular local characteristics.

The Art of Ethiopia, with a long Christian tradition, is also different from that of most of Africa, where the Traditional African religion (with Islam in the north) was dominant until the 20th century. African art includes prehistoric and ancient art, the Islamic art of West Africa, the Christian art of East Africa, and the traditional artifacts of these and other regions. Much African sculpture was historically in wood and other natural materials that have not survived from earlier than a few centuries ago, although rare older pottery and metal figures can be found some areas. Some of the earliest decorative objects, such as shell beads and evidence of paint, have been discovered in Africa, dating to the Middle Stone Age. Masks are important elements in the art of many peoples, along with human figures, and are often highly Stylized. There is a vast variety of styles, often varying within the same context of origin and depending on the use of the object, but wide regional trends are apparent; sculpture is most common among "groups of settled cultivators in the areas drained by the Niger and Congo rivers" in West Africa. Direct images of deities are relatively infrequent, but masks in particular are or were often made for ritual ceremonies. Since the late 19th century there has been an increasing amount of African art in Western collections, the finest pieces of which are displayed as part of the history of colonization.

African art has had an important influence on European Modernist art, which was inspired by their interest in abstract depiction. It was this appreciation of African sculpture that has been attributed to the very concept of "African art", as seen by European and American artists and art historians.

West African cultures developed bronze casting for reliefs, like the famous Benin Bronzes, to decorate palaces and for highly naturalistic royal heads from around the Bini town of Benin City, Edo State, as well as in terracotta or metal, from the 12th–14th centuries. Akan gold weights are a form of small metal sculptures produced over the period 1400–1900; some apparently represent proverbs, contributing a narrative element rare in African sculpture; and royal regalia included impressive gold sculptured elements. Many West African figures are used in religious rituals and are often coated with materials placed on them for ceremonial offerings. The Mande-speaking peoples of the same region make pieces from wood with broad, flat surfaces and arms and legs shaped like cylinders. In Central Africa, however, the main distinguishing characteristics include heart-shaped faces that are curved inward and display patterns of circles and dots.

Thematic elements
 Artistic creativity or Expressive individualism: In Western African art in particular, there is a widespread emphasis on expressive individualism while simultaneously being influenced by the work of predecessors. An example would be Dan's artistry as well as its presence in the Western African diaspora.
Emphasis on the human figure: The human figure has always been the primary subject matter for most African art, and this emphasis even influenced certain European traditions. For example, in the fifteenth century, Portugal traded with the Sapi culture near the Ivory Coast in West Africa, who created elaborate ivory saltcellars that were hybrids of African and European designs, most notably in the addition of the human figure (the human figure typically did not appear in Portuguese saltcellars). The human figure may symbolize the living or the dead, may reference chiefs, dancers, or various trades such as drummers or hunters, or even may be an anthropomorphic representation of a god or have other votive functions. Another common theme is the inter-morphosis of humans and animal.
Visual abstraction: African artworks tend to favour visual abstraction over naturalistic representation. This is because many African artworks generalize stylistic norms.

Scope
The study of African art until recently focused on the traditional art of certain well-known groups on the continent, with a particular emphasis on traditional sculpture, masks and other visual culture from non-Islamic West Africa,  Central Africa, and Southern Africa with a particular emphasis on the 19th and 20th centuries. Recently, however, there has been a movement among African art historians and other scholars to include the visual culture of other regions and time periods. The notion is that by including all African cultures and their visual culture over time in African art, there will be a greater understanding of the continent's visual aesthetics across time. Finally, the arts of the people of the African diaspora, in Brazil, the Caribbean and the south-eastern United States, have also begun to be included in the study of African art.

Materials

African art takes many forms and is made from many different materials. Most African artworks are wood sculptures, probably because wood is a very widespread material. Jewelry is a popular art form and is used to indicate rank, affiliation with a group, or purely aesthetics. African jewellery is made from such diverse materials as Tiger's eye stone, haematite, sisal, coconut shell, beads and ebony wood. Sculptures can be wooden, ceramic or carved out of stone like the famous Shona sculptures, and decorated or sculpted pottery comes from many regions. Various forms of textiles are made including chitenge, mud cloth and kente cloth. Mosaics made of butterfly wings or colored sand are popular in west Africa. Early African sculptures can be identified as being made of terracotta and bronze.

Traditional African religions

Traditional African religions have been extremely influential on African art forms across the continent. African art often stems from the themes of religious symbolism, functionalism and utilitarianism, and many pieces of art are created for spiritual rather than purely creative purposes.  Many African cultures emphasize the importance of ancestors as intermediaries between the living, the gods, and the supreme creator, and art is seen as a way to contact these spirits of ancestors.  Art may also be used to depict gods, and is valued for its functional purposes.  However, it is important to note that the arrival of both Christianity and Islam have also greatly influenced the art of the African continent, and traditions of both have been integrated into the beliefs and artwork of traditional African religion.

History 

The origins of African art lie long before recorded history.  The region's oldest known beads were made from Nassarius shells and worn as personal ornaments 72,000 years ago. In Africa, evidence for the making of paints by a complex process exists from about 100,000 years ago and of the use of pigments from around 320,000 years ago. African rock art in the Sahara in Niger preserves 6000-year-old carvings.  Along with sub-Saharan Africa, the western cultural arts, ancient Egyptian paintings and artifacts, and indigenous southern crafts also contributed greatly to African art. Often depicting the abundance of surrounding nature, the art was often abstract interpretations of animals, plant life, or natural designs and shapes. The Nubian Kingdom of Kush in modern Sudan was in close and often hostile contact with Egypt, and produced monumental sculptures mostly derivative of styles that did not lead to the north. In West Africa, the earliest known sculptures are from the Nok culture which thrived between 1,500 BC and 500 AD in modern Nigeria, with clay figures typically with elongated bodies and angular shapes.

More complex methods of producing art were developed in sub-Saharan Africa around the 10th century, some of the most notable advancements include the bronze work of Igbo Ukwu and the terracotta and metalworks of Ile Ife Bronze and brass castings, often ornamented with ivory and precious stones, became highly prestigious in much of West Africa, sometimes being limited to the work of court artisans and identified with royalty, as with the Benin Bronzes.

Influence on Western  art

During and after the 19th and 20th century colonial period, Westerners long characterized African art as "primitive."  The term carries with it negative connotations of underdevelopment and poverty. Colonization during the nineteenth century set up a Western understanding hinged on the belief that African art lacked technical ability due to its low socioeconomic status.

At the start of the twentieth century, art historians like Carl Einstein, Michał Sobeski and Leo Frobenius published important works about the thematic, giving African art the status of an aesthetic object, not only of an ethnographic object. At the same time, artists like Paul Gauguin, Pablo Picasso, Georges Braque, André Derain, Henri Matisse, Joseph Csaky, and Amedeo Modigliani became aware of and inspired by, African art, amongst other art forms. In a situation where the established avant-garde was straining against the constraints imposed by serving the world of appearances, African art demonstrated the power of supremely well-organized forms; produced not only by responding to the faculty of sight but also and often primarily, the faculty of imagination, emotion and mystical and religious experience. These artists saw in African art a formal perfection and sophistication unified with phenomenal expressive power. The study of and response to African art, by artists at the beginning of the twentieth century facilitated an explosion of interest in the abstraction, organisation and reorganisation of forms, and the exploration of emotional and psychological areas hitherto unseen in Western art. By these means, the status of visual art was changed. Art ceased to be merely and primarily aesthetic, but became also a true medium for philosophic and intellectual discourse, and hence more truly and profoundly aesthetic than ever before.

Traditional art

Traditional art describes the most popular and studied forms of African art which are typically found in museum collections.

Wooden masks, which might either be of human, animal or legendary creatures, are one of the most commonly found forms of art in western Africa. In their original contexts, ceremonial masks are used for celebrations, initiations, crop harvesting, and war preparation. The masks are worn by a chosen or initiated dancer. During the mask ceremony the dancer goes into a deep trance, and during this state of mind he  "communicates" with his ancestors. The masks can be worn in three different ways: vertically covering the face: as helmets, encasing the entire head, and as a crest, resting upon the head, which was commonly covered by material as part of the disguise. African masks often represent a spirit and it is strongly believed that the spirit of the ancestors possesses the wearer. Most African masks are made with wood, and can be decorated with: Ivory, animal hair, plant fibers (such as raffia), pigments (like kaolin), stones, and semi-precious gems also are included in the masks.

Statues, usually of wood or ivory, are often inlaid with cowrie shells, metal studs and nails. Decorative clothing is also commonplace and comprises another large part of African art. Among the most complex of African textiles is the colorful, strip-woven Kente cloth of Ghana. Boldly patterned mudcloth is another well known technique.

Contemporary African art 

Africa is home to a thriving contemporary art fine art culture.  This has been understudied until recently, due to scholars' and art collectors' emphasis on traditional art. Notable modern artists include El Anatsui, Marlene Dumas, William Kentridge, Karel Nel, Kendell Geers, Yinka Shonibare, Zerihun Yetmgeta, Odhiambo Siangla, Elias Jengo, Olu Oguibe, Lubaina Himid, Bili Bidjocka and Henry Tayali. Art bienniales are held in Dakar, Senegal, and Johannesburg, South Africa. Many contemporary African artists are represented in museum collections, and their art may sell for high prices at art auctions. Despite this, many contemporary African artists tend to have a difficult time finding a market for their work. Many contemporary African arts borrow heavily from traditional predecessors. Ironically, this emphasis on abstraction is seen by Westerners as an imitation of European and American Cubist and totemic artists, such as Pablo Picasso, Amedeo Modigliani and Henri Matisse, who, in the early twentieth century, was heavily influenced by traditional African art. This period was critical to the evolution of Western modernism in visual arts, symbolized by Picasso's breakthrough painting Les Demoiselles d'Avignon.

Today, Fathi Hassan is considered a major early representative of contemporary black African art. Contemporary African art was pioneered in the 1950s and 1960s in South Africa by artists like Irma Stern, Cyril Fradan, and Walter Battiss and through galleries like the Goodman Gallery in Johannesburg. More recently European galleries such as the  October Gallery in London and collectors such as Jean Pigozzi, Artur Walther  and Gianni Baiocchi in Rome have helped expand the interest in the subject. Numerous exhibitions at the Museum for African Art in New York and the African Pavilion at the 2007 Venice Biennale, which showcased the Sindika Dokolo African

Collection of Contemporary Art, has gone a long way to counter many of the myths and prejudices that haunt Contemporary African Art. The appointment of Nigerian Okwui Enwezor as artistic director of Documenta 11 and his African-centred vision of art propelled the careers of countless African artists onto the international stage.

A wide range of more-or-less traditional forms of art or adaptations of traditional style to contemporary taste is made for sale to tourists and others, including so-called "airport art". A number of vigorous popular traditions assimilate Western influences into African styles such as the elaborate fantasy coffins of Southern Ghana, made in a variety of different shapes which represent the occupations or interests of the deceased or elevate their status.  The Ga believe that an elaborate funeral will benefit the status of their loved ones in the after-life, so families often spare no expense when deciding which coffin they want for their relatives. These coffins can take the forms of cars, cocoa pods, chickens, or any other shape a family may decide best represents their deceased loved one.

Pop art and advertising art 
Art used to advertise for local businesses, including barbershops, movie houses, and appliance stores has become internationally celebrated in galleries and has launched the careers of many contemporary African artists, from Joseph Bertiers of Kenya to several movie poster painters in Ghana. Ghanaian hand-painted movie posters on canvas and flour sacks from the 1980s and 1990s have been exhibited at museums around the world and sparked viral social media attention due to their highly imaginative and stylized depictions of Western films. This creative interpretation of Western culture through African art styles is also on display with the tradition of praise portraits depicting international celebrities, which often served as storefront advertising art, and have since become widely valued and collected in the global art market.

Minimalist African art 
Another notable contemporary African artist is Amir Nour who is a Sudanese artist currently residing in Chicago. In the 1960s he created a metal sculpture called Grazing at Shendi (1969) which consists of geometric shapes that connect with his memory of his homeland. The sculpture resembles grazing sheep in the distance. He valued discovering art within the society of the artist, including culture, tradition, and background.

By country, civilizations or people

West Africa

Ghana

Ghana is famous for creating the most famous bona fide African expressions and makes, these range from wood carvings, brass works, figures, gems and different types of materials. Ghana still holds up to be notoriety as a nation with endless saves of minerals, such as gold, diamond, silver, bronze, etc. Ghana provides plenty of assistance for craftsmen to create and design jewelry, whether it be contemporary or traditional. 

A Kente is a traditional, multi-coloured, hand-woven, quilted cloth. It is also a sort of silk and cotton texture made of interlaced cloth strips. The cloth is central to the Ghanaian culture and it is also traditionally used to be worn as a wrap-around both men and women with slightly different variations for both of them. This fabric is worn by almost every Ghanaian tribe member.

Colors And Meaning

There are different color variations for the kente, each color has different meanings. Here are some examples:

Black: maturation

White: purification

Yellow: preciousness

Blue: peacefulness

Red: bloodshed

Akan art originated among the Akan people. Akan art is known for its vibrant artistic traditions, including textiles, sculptures, Akan gold weights, as well as gold and silver jewelry. The Akan people are known for their strong connection between visual and verbal expressions and a distinctive blending of art and philosophy. Akan culture values gold above all other metals and believes that it can portray the supernatural elements behind many things, including royal authority and cultural values. The Asante, who is a dominant Akan-speaking culture in Ghana, trace their origins back to the arrival of a golden-stool, which is now said to hold the soul of the Asante nation within it. Gold was considered an earthly counterpart to the sun and was often utilized in art to display the importance of the king, making it an essential representation of their cultural and social values.  Kente cloth is another extremely important art tradition of Akan culture.  Tradition states that Kente cloth originated as weavers tried to copy the weaving abilities of spiders with their webs.  Kente cloth is world renowned for its colors and patterns. Its original purpose was to portray royal power and authority, but has now become a symbol of tradition and has been adopted by several other cultures.

Nigeria
Nigerian culture is illustrated through art and folklore. Nigeria draws its inspiration for their art from traditional folk heritage of the region. There are different types of artwork from the Nigerian culture. Some of these works of art can be stone carvings, potteries, glass work, wood carvings and bronze works. Benin and Awka are considered to be the central places for wood carving. Woodcarvers have been thriving throughout the south of Nigeria from time immemorial.
 
Examples of Nigerian Traditional Art

Masks

Masks are a piece of the animist confidence of the Yoruba individuals. The veils are painted, and fans wear them at memorial services and different functions to mollify the spirits.

Pottery

Pottery has a long custom in Nigeria. Pottery was well known from 100 B.C. These days Suleja, Abuja and Ilorin are viewed as significant figures of customary ceramics. Potters in Nigeria are frequently female, and usually practice for the methods to be passed on through families.

Textiles

Yorubas utilize a bush to make indigo-shaded batik-colored fabric. Ladies generally do the withering, while in the north, the specialty is drilled only by men. Weavers everywhere throughout the nation produce a splendid texture with ribbon structures. Oyo state is known for its fine loom materials while fabric from Abia state utilizes a broadloom strategy.

The Nok culture is an early Iron Age population whose material remains are named after the Ham village of Nok in Kaduna State of Nigeria, where their famous terracotta sculptures were first discovered in 1928. The Nok Culture appeared in northern Nigeria around 1500 BC and vanished under unknown circumstances around 500 AD, thus having lasted approximately 2,000 years.

The function of Nok terracotta sculptures remains unknown. For the most part, the terracotta is preserved in the form of scattered fragments. That is why Nok art is best known today only for the heads, both male and female, whose hairstyles are particularly detailed and refined. The statues are in fragments because the discoveries are usually made from alluvial mud, in terrain made by the erosion of water. The terracotta statues found there are hidden, rolled, polished, and broken. Rarely are works of great size conserved intact making them highly valued on the international art market. The terracotta figures are hollow, coil built, nearly life-sized human heads and bodies that are depicted with highly stylized features, abundant jewelry, and varied postures.

Little is known of the original function of the pieces, but theories include ancestor portrayal, grave markers, and charms to prevent crop failure, infertility, and illness. Also, based on the dome-shaped bases found on several figures, they could have been used as finials for the roofs of ancient structures. Margaret Young-Sanchez, Associate Curator of Art of the Americas, Africa, and Oceania in The Cleveland Museum of Art, explains that most Nok ceramics were shaped by hand from coarse-grained clay and subtractively sculpted in a manner that suggests an influence from wood carving. After some drying, the sculptures were covered with slip and burnished to produce a smooth, glossy surface. The figures are hollow, with several openings to facilitate thorough drying and firing. The firing process most likely resembled that used today in Nigeria, in which the pieces are covered with grass, twigs, and leaves and burned for several hours.

As a result of natural erosion and deposition, Nok terracottas were scattered at various depths throughout the Sahel grasslands, causing difficulty in the dating and classification of the mysterious artifacts. Two archaeological sites, Samun Dukiya and Taruga, were found containing Nok art that had remained unmoved. Radiocarbon and thermo-luminescence tests narrowed the sculptures’ age down to between 2,000 and 2,500 years ago, making them some of the oldest in Western Africa. Many further dates were retrieved in the course of new archaeological excavations, extending the beginnings of the Nok tradition even further back in time.

Because of the similarities between the two sites, archaeologist Graham Connah believes that "Nok artwork represents a style that was adopted by a range of iron-using farming societies of varying cultures, rather than being the diagnostic feature of a particular human group as has often been claimed."

Benin art

Benin art is the art from the Kingdom of Benin or Edo Empire (1440–1897), a pre-colonial African state located in what is now known as the South-South region of Nigeria. The Benin Bronzes are a group of more than a thousand metal plaques and sculptures that decorated the royal palace of the Kingdom of Benin in what is now modern-day Nigeria. Collectively, the objects form the best-known examples of Benin art, created from the thirteenth century onwards, by the Edo people, which also included other sculptures in brass or bronze, including some famous portrait heads and smaller pieces.

In 1897 most of the plaques and other objects in the collection were taken by a British force during the Benin Expedition of 1897, which took place as British control in Southern Nigeria was being consolidated. Two hundred of the pieces were taken to the British Museum, while the rest were purchased by other museums in Europe. Today, a large number are held by the British Museum, as well as by other notable collections in German and American museums.

Igbo

The Igbo produce a wide variety of art including traditional figures, masks, artifacts and textiles, plus works in metals such as bronze. Artworks form the Igbo have been found from as early as the 9th century with the bronze artifacts found at Igbo Ukwu.  Their masks are similar with the Fang ones, being white and black in about same parts.

Yoruba 

Yoruba art is best known for the heads from Ife, made of ceramic, brass and other materials. Much of their art is associated with the royal courts. They also produced elaborate masks and doors, full of details and painted in bright colors, such as blue, yellow, red and white.

Other ethnic groups of Nigeria

Mali

The primary ethnic groups in Mali are the Bambara (also known as Bamana) and the Dogon. Smaller ethnic groups consist of the Marka, and the Bozo fisherman of the Niger River. Ancient civilizations flourished in areas like Djene and Timbuktu, where a great variety of ancient bronze and terra-cotta figures have been unearthed.

Djenné-Djenno 

Djenné-Djenno is famous for its figurines which depict humans and animals including snakes and horses. They are made of terracotta, a material that has been used in West Africa for some ten thousand years.

Bambara

The Bambara people adapted many artistic traditions and began to create display pieces. Before money was the main drive of creation of their artworks they used their abilities solely as a sacred craft for display of spiritual pride, religious beliefs and display of customs. Example artworks include the Bamana n'tomo mask. Other statues were created for people such as hunters and farmers so others could leave offerings after long farming seasons or group hunts. The stylistic variations in Bambara art are extreme sculptures, masks and headdresses display either stylized or realistic features, and either weathered or encrusted patinas. Until quite recently, the function of Bambara pieces was shrouded in mystery, but in the last twenty years, field studies have revealed that certain types of figures and headdresses were associated with a number of the societies that structure Bambara life. During the 1970s a group of approximately twenty figures, masks and TjiWara headdresses belonging to the so-called 'Segou style' were identified. The style is distinct and recognizable by its typical flat faces, arrow-shaped noses, all-over body triangular scarifications and, on the figures, splayed hands.

Masks
There are three major and one minor type of Bambara mask. The first type, used by the N'tomo society, has a typical comb-like structure above the face, is worn during dances and may be covered with cowrie shells. The second type of mask, associated with the Komo society, has a spherical head with two antelope horns on the top and an enlarged, flattened mouth. They are used during dances, but some have a thickly encrusted patina acquired during other ceremonies in which libations are poured over them.

The third type has connections with the Nama society and is carved in the form of an articulated bird's head, while the fourth, minor type, represents a stylized animal head and is used by the Kore society. Other Bambara masks are known to exist, but unlike those described above, they cannot be linked to specific societies or ceremonies. Bambara carvers have established a reputation for the zoomorphic headdresses worn by Tji-Wara society members. Although they are all different, they all display a highly abstract body, often incorporating a zig-zag motif, which represents the sun's course from east to west, and a head with two large horns. Bambara members of the Tji-Wara society wear the headdress while dancing in their fields at sowing time, hoping to increase the crop yield.

Statuettes
Bambara statuettes are primarily used during the annual ceremonies of the Guan society. During these ceremonies, a group of up to seven figures, measuring from 80 to 130 cm in height, are removed from their sanctuaries by the elder members of the society. The sculptures are washed, re-oiled and sacrifices are offered to them at their shrines. These figures – some of which date from between the 14th and 16th centuries – usually display a typical crested coiffure, often adorned with a talisman.

Two of these figures were ascribed great significance: a seated or standing maternity figure called Guandousou – known in the West as 'Bambara Queen' – and a male figure called Guantigui, who usually appears holding a knife. The two figures were surrounded by Guannyeni attendant figures standing or seated in various positions, holding a vessel, or a musical instrument, or their breasts. During the 1970s, numerous fakes from Bamako which were based on these sculptures entered the market. They were produced in Bamako.

Other Bambara figures, called Dyonyeni, are thought to be associated with either the southern Dyo society or the Kwore society. These female or hermaphrodite figures usually appear with geometric features such as large conical breasts and measure between 40 and 85 cm in height. The blacksmith members of the Dyo society used them during dances to celebrate the end of their initiation ceremonies. They were handled, held by dancers and placed in the middle of the ceremonial circle.

Among the corpus of Bambara figures, Boh sculptures are perhaps the best known. These statues represent a highly stylized animal or human figure, and are made of wood which is repeatedly covered in thick layers of earth impregnated with sacrificial materials such as millet, chicken or goat blood, kola nuts and alcoholic drinks. They were employed by the Kono and the Komo societies and served as receptacles for spiritual forces, and could, in turn, be used for apotropaic purposes.

Each special creative trait a person obtained was seen as a different way to please higher spirits.

Dogon
Dogon art consists primarily of sculptures. Their art revolves around Dogon religious values, ideals, and freedoms (Laude, 19). Dogon sculptures are not made to be seen publicly, and are commonly hidden from the public eye within the houses of families, sanctuaries, or kept with the Hogon (Laude, 20). The importance of secrecy is due to the symbolic meaning behind the pieces and the process by which they are made.

Themes found throughout Dogon sculpture consist of figures with raised arms, superimposed bearded figures, horsemen, stools with caryatids, women with children, figures covering their faces, women grinding pearl millet, women bearing vessels on their heads, donkeys bearing cups, musicians, dogs, quadruped-shaped troughs or benches, figures bending from the waist, mirror-images, aproned figures, and standing figures (Laude, 46–52). Signs of other contacts and origins are evident in Dogon art. The Dogon people were not the first inhabitants of the cliffs of Bandiagara. Influence from Tellem art is evident in Dogon art because of its rectilinear designs (Laude, 24).

Dogon art is extremely versatile, although common stylistic characteristics – such as a tendency towards stylization – are apparent on the statues. Their art deals with the myths whose complex ensemble regulates the life of the individual. The sculptures are preserved in innumerable sites of worship, personal or family altars, altars for rain, altars to protect hunters, in market. As a general characterization of Dogon statues, one could say that they render the human body in a simplified way, reducing it to its essentials. Some are extremely elongated with emphasis on geometric forms. The subjective impression is one of immobility with a mysterious sense of a solemn gravity and serene majesty, although conveying at the same time a latent movement. Dogon sculpture recreates the hermaphroditic silhouettes of the Tellem, featuring raised arms and a thick patina made of blood and millet beer. The four Nommo couples, the mythical ancestors born of the god Amma, ornament stools, pillars or men's meeting houses, door locks, and granary doors. The primordial couple is represented sitting on a stool, the base of which depicts the earth while the upper surface represents the sky; the two are interconnected by the Nommo. The seated female figures, their hands on their abdomen, are linked to the fertility cult, incarnating the first ancestor who died in childbirth, and are the object of offerings of food and sacrifices by women who are expecting a child.

Kneeling statues of protective spirits are placed at the head of the dead to absorb their spiritual strength and to be their intermediaries with the world of the dead, into which they accompany the deceased before once again being placed on the shrines of the ancestors. Horsemen are reminders of the fact that, according to myth, the horse was the first animal present on earth. The Dogon style has evolved into a kind of cubism: ovoid head, squared shoulders, tapered extremities, pointed breasts, forearms, and thighs on a parallel plane, hairdos stylized by three or four incised lines. Dogon sculptures serve as a physical medium in initiations and as an explanation of the world. They serve to transmit an understanding to the initiated, who will decipher the statue according to the level of their knowledge. Carved animal figures, such as dogs and ostriches, are placed on village foundation altars to commemorate sacrificed animals, while granary doors, stools and house posts are also adorned with figures and symbols.

There are nearly eighty styles of masks, but their basic characteristic is great boldness in the use of geometric shapes, independent of the various animals they are supposed to represent. The structure of a large number of masks is based on the interplay of vertical and horizontal lines and shapes. Another large group has triangular, conic shapes. All masks have large geometric eyes and stylized features. The masks are often polychrome, but on many the color is lost; after the ceremonies they were left on the ground and quickly deteriorated because of termites and other conditions. The Dogon continue an ancient masquerading tradition, which commemorates the origin of death. According to their myths, death came into the world as a result of primeval man's transgressions against the divine order. Dama memorial ceremonies are held to accompany the dead into the ancestral realm and restore order to the universe. The performance of masqueraders – sometimes as many as 400 – at these ceremonies is considered absolutely necessary. In the case of the dama, the timing, types of masks involved, and other ritual elements are often specific to one or two villages and may not resemble those seen in locations only several kilometres distant. The masks also appear during baga-bundo rites performed by small numbers of masqueraders before the burial of a male Dogon. Dogon masks evoke the form of animals associated with their mythology, yet their significance is only understood by the highest ranking cult members whose role is to explain the meaning of each mask to a captivated audience.

Other ethnic groups of Mali

Burkina Faso

Burkina Faso is a small, landlocked country north of Ghana and south of Mali and Niger. Economically, it is one of the four or five poorest countries in the world. Culturally, it is extremely rich. In part, this is because so few people from Burkina have become Muslim or Christian. Many of the ancient artistic traditions for which Africa is so well known have been preserved in Burkina Faso because so many people continue to honor the ancestral spirits, and the spirits of nature. In great part, they honor the spirits through the use of masks and carved figures. Many of the countries to the north of Burkina Faso had become predominantly Muslim, while many of the countries to the south of Burkina Faso are heavily Christian. In contrast, many of the people of Burkina Faso continue to offer prayers and sacrifices to the spirits of nature and to the spirits of their ancestors. The result is that they continue to use the sorts of art that we see in museums in Europe and America.

One of the principal obstacles to understanding the art of Burkina Faso, including that of the Bwa,  has been a confusion between the styles of the Bwa, "gurunsi", and Mossi,  and a confusion of the Bwa people  with their neighbors to the west the Bobo people.  This confusion was the result of the use by French colonial officers of Jula  interpreters at the turn of the century.  these interpreters considered the two peoples to be the same and so referred to the Bobo as "Bobo-Fing" and to the Bwa as "Bobo-Oule."   In fact these two peoples are not related at all. Their languages are quite different, their social systems are quite different,  and certainly their art is quite different. In terms of artistic styles the confusion stems from the fact that the Bwa, "gurunsi'" and Mossi  make masks that are covered with red white and black geometric graphic patterns.  This is simply the style of the Voltaic or Gur peoples,  and also includes the Dogon and other peoples who speak Voltaic languages.

Ivory Coast(Côte d'Ivoire)

The Baoulé, the Senoufo and the Dan peoples are skilled at carving wood and each culture produces wooden masks in wide variety. The Ivorian people use masks to represent animals in caricature to depict deities, or to represent the souls of the departed.

As the masks are held to be of great spiritual power, it is considered a taboo for anyone other than specially trained persons or chosen ones to wear or possess certain masks. These ceremonial masks are each thought to have a soul, or life force, and wearing these masks is thought to transform the wearer into the entity the mask represents.

Ivory Coast(Côte d'Ivoire) also has modern painters and illustrators. Gilbert G. Groud criticizes the ancient beliefs in black magic, as held with the spiritual masks mentioned above, in his illustrated book Magie Noire.

East Africa

Kenya

Around Lake Turkana exist ancient petroglyphs depicting human figures and animals. Bantu tribes build funeral posts, carvings of human heads atop geometric designs are still created. Though the original posts no longer exist, these more recent creations are thought to be a continuation of the practice. The Kikuyu people also continue the designs of ancient tradition in the designs painted on their shields.

Bantu contemporary Kenyan artists include Elimo Njau, founder of the Paa Ya Paa Art Centre, a Nairobi-based artists workshop. From the University of Nairobi School of Fine Art and Design came Bulinya Martins and Sarah Shiundu. The two by virtue of having learned many basic techniques in design are highly innovative both in style, use of color and execution. Unlike most contemporary Kenyan artist they paint using oils, acrylics and watercolors and/or combination.

The Eskenazi Museum of Art at Indiana University has a large collection of traditional art objects from Kenya including jewelry, containers, weapons, walking sticks, headrests, stools, utensils, and other objects available online.

Ethiopia

Ethiopian art from the 4th century until the 20th can be divided into two broad groupings. First comes a distinctive tradition of Christian art, mostly for churches, in forms including painting, crosses, icons, illuminated manuscripts, and other metalwork such as crowns.  Secondly there are popular arts and crafts such as textiles, basketry and jewellery, in which Ethiopian traditions are closer to those of other peoples in the region. Its history goes back almost three thousand years to the kingdom of D'mt. The Ethiopian Orthodox Tewahedo Church has been the predominant religion in Ethiopia for over 1500 years, for most of this period in a very close relation, or union, with the Coptic Christianity of Egypt, so that Coptic art has been the main formative influence on Ethiopian church art.

Prehistoric rock art comparable to that of other African sites survives in a number of places and, until the arrival of Christianity, stone stelae, often carved with simple reliefs, were erected as grave-markers and for other purposes in many regions; Tiya is one important site. The "pre-Axumite" Iron Age culture of about the 5th century BCE to the 1st century CE was influenced by the Kingdom of Kush to the north, and settlers from Arabia, and produced cities with simple temples in stone, such as the ruined one at Yeha, which is impressive for its date in the 4th or 5th century BCE.

The powerful Kingdom of Aksum emerged in the 1st century BCE and dominated Ethiopia until the 10th century, having become very largely Christian from the 4th century. Although some buildings and large, pre-Christian stelae exist, there appears to be no surviving Ethiopian Christian art from the Axumite period. However, the earliest works remaining show a clear continuity with Coptic art of earlier periods. There was considerable destruction of churches and their contents in the 16th century when the country was invaded by Muslim neighbours. The revival of art after this was influenced by Catholic European art in both iconography and elements of style, but retained its Ethiopian character. In the 20th century, Western artists and architects began to be commissioned by the government, and to train local students, and more fully Westernized art was produced alongside continuations of traditional church art.

Church paintings in Ethiopia were likely produced as far back as the introduction of Christianity in the 4th century AD, although the earliest surviving examples come from the church of Debre Selam Mikael in the Tigray Region, dated to the 11th century AD. However, the 7th-century AD followers of the Islamic prophet Muhammad who fled to Axum in temporary exile mentioned that the original Church of Our Lady Mary of Zion was decorated with paintings. Other early paintings include those from the rock-hewn churches of Lalibela, dated to the 12th century AD, and in nearby Geneta Maryam, dated to the 13th century AD. However, paintings in illuminated manuscripts predate the earliest surviving church paintings; for instance, the Ethiopian Garima Gospels of the 4th–6th centuries AD contain illuminated scenes imitating the contemporary Byzantine style.

Ethiopian painting, on walls, in books, and in icons, is highly distinctive, though the style and iconography are closely related to the simplified Coptic version of Late Antique and Byzantine Christian art. From the 16th century, Roman Catholic church art and European art in general began to exert some influence. However, Ethiopian art is highly conservative and retained much of its distinct character until modern times. The production of illuminated manuscripts for use continued up to the present day.

Another important form of Ethiopian art, also related to Coptic styles, are crosses made from wood and metal. They are usually copper alloy or brass, plated (at least originally) with gold or silver. The heads are typically flat cast plates with elaborate and complex openwork decoration. The cross motif emerges from the decoration, with the whole design often forming a rotated square or circular shape, though the designs are highly varied and inventive. Many incorporate curved motifs rising from the base, which are called the "arms of Adam". Except in recent Western-influenced examples, they usually have no corpus, or figure of Christ, and the design often incorporates numerous smaller crosses.  Engraved figurative imagery has sometimes been added.  Crosses are mostly either processional crosses, with the metal head mounted on a long wooden staff, carried in religious processions and during the liturgy, or hand crosses, with a shorter metal handle in the same casting as the head. Smaller crosses worn as jewellery are also common.

Ethiopia has great ethnic and linguistic diversity, and styles in secular traditional crafts vary greatly in different parts of the country. There are a range of traditions in textiles, many with woven geometric decoration, although many types are also usually plain. Ethiopian church practices make a great deal of use of colourful textiles, and the more elaborate types are widely used as church vestments and as hangings, curtains and wrappings in churches, although they have now largely been supplanted by Western fabrics. Examples of both types can be seen in the picture at the top of the article.  Icons may normally be veiled with a semi-transparent or opaque cloth; very thin chiffon-type cotton cloth is a speciality of Ethiopia, though usually with no pattern.

Colourful basketry with a coiled construction is common in rural Ethiopia. The products have many uses, such as storing grains, seeds and food and being used as tables and bowls. The Muslim city of Harar is well known for its high-quality basketry, and many craft products of the Muslim minority relate to wider Islamic decorative traditions.

Tanzania

Art from Tanzania is known for paintings by modern artists like Tinga Tinga or George Lilanga, and for traditional as well as modern Makonde sculptures. Like in other regions, there is also a diversified tradition of producing textile art.

Tinga Tinga art has roots in decorating hut walls in central and south Tanzania. It was first in 1968 when Edward Said Tingatinga started to paint on wooden sheets with enamel colours when Tinga Tinga art became known. The art of the Makonde must be subdivided into different areas. The Makonde are known as master carvers throughout East Africa, and their statuary that can be found being sold in tourist markets and in museums alike. They traditionally carve household objects, figures and masks. Since the 1950s the so-called Modern Makonde Art has been developed. An essential step was the turning to abstract figures, mostly spirits (Shetani) that play a special role. Makonde are also part of the important contemporary artists of Africa today. An outstanding position is taken by George Lilanga.

Central Africa

Democratic Republic of Congo

Kuba Kingdom

The Kuba Kingdom (also rendered as the Kingdom of the Bakuba, Songora or Bushongo) was a pre-colonial kingdom in Central Africa. The Kuba Kingdom flourished between the 17th and 19th centuries in the region bordered by the Sankuru, Lulua, and Kasai rivers in the south-east of the modern-day Democratic Republic of the Congo. A great deal of the art was created for the courts of chiefs and kings and was profusely decorated, incorporating cowrie shells and animal skins (especially leopard) as symbols of wealth, prestige and power. Masks are also important to the Kuba. They are used both in the rituals of the court and in the initiation of boys into adulthood, as well as at funerals.

Luba Kingdom

The Kingdom of Luba or Luba Empire (1585–1889) was a pre-colonial Central African state that arose in the marshy grasslands of the Upemba Depression in what is now southern Democratic Republic of Congo. Today, the Luba people or baLuba are an ethno-linguistic group indigenous to the south-central region of the Democratic Republic of the Congo. The majority of them live in this country, residing mainly in its Katanga, Kasai, and Maniema provinces.

As in the Kuba Kingdom, the Luba Kingdom held the arts in high esteem. A carver held relatively high status, which was displayed by an adze (axe) that he carried over his shoulder. Luba art was not very uniform because of the vast territory which the kingdom controlled.  However, some characteristics are common.  The important role of woman in the creation myths and political society resulted in many objects of prestige being decorated with female figures.

Other ethnic groups of Democratic Republic of Congo

Chad

Sao

The Sao civilisation in Middle Africa from circa the sixth century BC to as late as the sixteenth century AD, and lived by the Chari River around Lake Chad in territory that later became part of Cameroon and Chad. Their most important artworks are the terracotta figurines. These figurines represent humans and animals. Other kinds of artifacts show that the Saos were skilled workers in bronze, copper, and iron.

Gabon

The Fang people make masks and basketry, carvings, and sculptures. Fang art is characterized by organized clarity and distinct lines and shapes. Bieri, boxes to hold the remains of ancestors, are carved with protective figures. Masks are worn in ceremonies and for hunting. The faces are painted white with black features. Myene art centers around Myene rituals for death. Female ancestors are represented by white painted masks worn by male relatives. The Bekota use brass and copper to cover their carvings. They use baskets to hold ancestral remains. Tourism is rare in Gabon, and unlike in other African countries, art is not spurred on by commerce.

Southern Africa

Botswana

In the northern part of Botswana, women in the villages of Etsha and Gumare are noted for their skill at crafting baskets from Mokola Palm and local dyes. The baskets are generally woven into three types: large, lidded baskets used for storage large, open baskets for carrying objects on the head or for winnowing threshed grain, and smaller plates for winnowing pounded grain. The artistry of these baskets is being steadily enhanced through color use and improved designs as they are increasingly produced for commercial use.

The oldest evidence ancient paintings from both Botswana and South Africa. Depictions of hunting, both animal and human figures were made by the San people dating before civilization over 20,000 years old within the Kalahari desert.

Zimbabwe
The culture from Great Zimbabwe left more impressive buildings than sculpture, but the eight soapstone Zimbabwe Birds appear to have had a special significance and were presumably mounted on monoliths. Modern Zimbabwean sculptors in soapstone have achieved considerable international success. Southern Africa's oldest known clay figures date from 400 to 600 AD and have cylindrical heads with a mixture of human and animal features.

South Africa

Mapungubwe

Kingdom of Mapungubwe (1075–1220) was a pre-colonial state in Southern Africa located at the confluence of the Shashe and Limpopo rivers, south of Great Zimbabwe. The most famous Mapungubwe artwork is a tiny golden rhino, known as the golden rhinoceros of Mapungubwe. In other graves from Mapengubwe were found objects made of iron, gold, copper, ceramic and glass beads.

Southern Ndebele

The Southern Ndebele people are famous for the way they paint their houses. Distinct geometric forms against stark, contrasting colours form the basis of the Ndebele style, which encompassed everything from the architecture, clothing and tools of the people. While color has almost always had a role in drawing emotions in art, the Ndebele were one of the first Southern African tribes to utilise a wide array of colours to convey specific meaning as part of their very lives.

North Africa

Egypt

Persisting for 3,000 years and thirty dynasties, the "official" art of Ancient Egypt was centred on the state religion of the time. The art ranged from stone carvings of both massive statues and small statuettes, to wall art that depicted both history and mythology. In 2600 BC the maturity of Egyptian carving reached a peak it did not reach again for another 1,500 years during the reign of Rameses II.

A lot of the art possesses a certain stiffness, with figures poised upright and rigid in a regal fashion. Bodily proportions also appear to be mathematically derived, giving rise to a sense of fantastic perfection in the figures depicted. This most likely was used to reinforce the godliness of the ruling caste.

Nubia and Sudan

The people of Nubia, living in southern Egypt and the northern region of Sudan, developed historical art styles similar to that of their Egyptian neighbors to the north. However, Nubian art was not merely a product of colonization by ancient Egypt, but rather due to a mutual exchange of ideas and ideologies along the Nile Valley. The earliest art of the region comes from the Kerma culture, which was contemporary to Old and Middle Kingdom Egypt. Art from this period exhibits Egyptian faience along with distinct black-topped pottery of Nubian origin. In the latter Napatan period of the Kingdom of Kush, art showed more influence from Egypt as the people in the region were worshiping Egyptian gods.

After these historical periods, the inhabitants of Sudan created artworks in different styles, both in indigenous African ways or influenced by Byzantine Christian, Islamic and modern art traditions.

African Diaspora

Museums

Many art and ethnographic museums have a section dedicated to the art from Sub-Saharan Africa, for example the British Museum, Musée du Quai Branly – Jacques Chirac in Paris, Metropolitan Museum of Art in New York and the Ethnological Museum of Berlin.  Not many western museums are dedicated only to African art, like the Africa Museum in Brussels,  National Museum of African Art in Washington, D.C., and African Art Museum of Maryland in Columbia, Maryland.  Some colleges and universities hold collections of African art, for example Howard University in Washington, DC and Spelman College in Atlanta, Georgia.

Nearly all countries in Africa have at least a national museum housing African art, often very largely from that country, for example the Sierra Leone National Museum and Nigerian National Museum in Lagos.  There are also many smaller museums in the provinces.

The display of African art and artifacts in European museums has long been controversial in various ways, and the French-commissioned "Report on the restitution of African cultural heritage" (2018) has marked a key moment, leading to an increase in the return of artefacts. However, there are other examples, such as the Museum of African Art in Belgrade which was opened in 1977 because of Yugoslavia's relations with many African countries thanks to the Non-Aligned Movement. The museum was opened out of the desire to acquaint the people of Yugoslavia with the art and culture of Africa since there was a deeply rooted notion about Yugoslavia sharing a friendship with African countries thanks to their similar struggles; all of the original items in the museums were legally bought by the Yugoslav ambassador and journalist Zdravko Pečar and his wife Veda Zagorac, while more recent acquisition were either bought by the museum, received as gifts from Yugoslavs who lived in Africa or were diplomatic gifts to the museum by the ambassadors of African countries.

The Congolese activist Mwazulu Diyabanza has taken direct action against European museums to take back items he says belong to Africa.

See also

 Culture of Africa
Contemporary African art
African art in Western collections
 African folk art
 African traditional masks
 Tribal art
The Africa Center
 :Category:African artists

Notes

References

General sources
 Biasio, Elisabeth, "Ethiopia and Eritrea" . Grove Art Online. Oxford Art Online. Oxford University Press. 4 Feb. 2013.
 Hugh Honour and John Fleming, A World History of Art, 1st ed. 1982 (many later editions), Macmillan, London, page refs to 1984 Macmillan 1st en. paperback. .
 Blackmun Visonà, Monica et al. A History of Art in Africa (2001) Prentice Hall, New York .
 Ross, Emma George. "African Christianity in Ethiopia". In Heilbrunn Timeline of Art History. New York: The Metropolitan Museum of Art, 2000–.  (October 2002)
 Roy, Christopher D., "The Art of Burkina Faso", Art & Life in Africa, University of Iowa.
 Tinga Tinga Art: Contemporary East African Art

Further reading
 Beidelman, T. O., "Promoting African Art. The Catalogue to the Exhibit of African Art at the Royal Academy of Arts, London", Anthropos, Vol. 92, H. 1./3. (1997), pp. 3–20, Anthropos Institute, .
 Breunig, Peter (2014). Nok: African Sculpture in Archaeological Context. Frankfurt: Africa Magna Verlag.

External links

 African Art Facts By CasildArt
 Website with more than 130 art museums in Africa

African art
Visual arts by region